The fourth and final season of the TV Land's original sitcom The Exes premiered on November 5, 2014 at 10:30 PM EST. A total of 22 episodes were produced for the fourth season, which was split into winter and summer segments of 12 and 10 episodes each, respectively. The series stars Donald Faison, Wayne Knight, Kristen Johnston, David Alan Basche and Kelly Stables.

As of September 16, 2015, 64 episodes of The Exes have aired, concluding the fourth season and the series.

Cast
 Donald Faison as Phil Chase
 Wayne Knight as Haskell Lutz
 David Alan Basche as Stuart Gardner 
 Kelly Stables as Eden Konkler
 Kristen Johnston as Holly Franklin

Production
On February 3, 2014, TV Land renewed The Exes for a 12-episode fourth season, which premiered on November 5, 2014. Leah Remini continues her recurring role of Nikki Gardner into this season. Season four of The Exes began taping on June 25, 2014. On September 5, 2014, the episode order for season four was extended to 24 episodes, consisting of two 12-episode blocks. The first 12 episodes concluded on February 4, 2015, with the remaining 12 episodes set to begin on July 15, 2015. The show was cancelled on August 10, 2015 with 6 episodes left to air, bringing the season to a total of 22 episodes.

Guest stars for this season include Nadine Velazquez as Alessandra, Phil's high school crush that he reconnects with; Michael Trucco as Jeff, a presumed widow that Holly attempts to connect with; Stacy Keach as Bill Drake, a veteran whose daughter Stuart dates; Nikki DeLoach as Katie Drake, Bill's daughter who dates Staurt, thinking he's a marine; Elizabeth Regen as Dani, Haskell's date, who Phil and Holly mistake for a man; Coco Jones as Vanessa, a new intern at Holly's office; Peter Onorati as Frank Gardner, Stuart and Nikki's father; Jenifer Lewis as Caren Dupree, an actress from Phil's favorite childhood television show; Jonathan Cake as Robert Thomas, a famous chef that Stuart and Holly take lessons from; Leslie David Baker as Officer Wilson, a retiring cop that Haskell goes on a ride along with; Arden Myrin as Stacy, a girl from Ohio that stays at the guys apartment while visiting New York; Matt Letscher as Charles Hayward, a Congressman that Holly meets in Jamaica, and becomes engaged to; and Rebecca Wisocky as Victoria Chaplin, Charles' chief of staff, who takes a liking to Stuart. Brandon Routh reprised his season three role of Steve, in the season premiere. Judith Light also reprised her role as Majorie, in episode twelve. Lisa Ann Walter reprises her role as Margo, Haskell's ex-wife, in the final two episodes of the season.

Episodes

References

External links
 

2014 American television seasons
2015 American television seasons